Crangonoidea is a superfamily of shrimp containing the two families Crangonidae and Glyphocrangonidae.

References

Caridea
Arthropod superfamilies